The Last Real Texas Blues Band Featuring Doug Sahm  is an album by Doug Sahm released by Antone's Record Label in February 1995. 

Following the release of his debut with the label Juke Box Music, Sahm recorded further tracks that complemented by the 1988 recordings of his live performances at Antone's night club in Austin, Texas turned into his second release. The album was favored by the critics and it received a Grammy nomination for Best Traditional Blues Album.

Background and recording
During the beginning of the 1990s, Doug Sahm was part of the Texas Tornados. In 1994, he formed another lineup of the Sir Douglas Quintet. Intermittently, he continued to perform at the Austin blues night club Antone's. Sahm started to perform at the club following his return to Austin in 1988, and he was signed by Clifford Antone to Antone's Record Label. His first release, Juke Box Music was released in 1989. In 1993, Sahm performed during the eighteenth anniversary of the club with a backing that consisted of house band musicians Derek O'Brien and Randy Garaby, with the addition of Sahm's usual collaborators: saxophonist Rocky Morales, keyboardist Sauce Gonzalez, drummer George Rains and bassist Jack Barber. 

By 1995, he performed blues at Antone's with the Doug Sahm Orchestra. In 1995, Sahm and the band recorded at Pedernales studio and Arlyn studios material for a new album. Sahm's live performances from 1988 had been recorded by Reelsound studios. The album was produced by Sahm and O'brien.

Release
An album consisting of the collection of tracks was presented by Sahm at Antone's in January 1995, as now called his backing band "The Last Real Texas Blues Band". Sahm then announced an album release called The Last Texas Blues Band featuring Doug Sahm due for February 1995, and a subsequent tour. The album was nominated for Best Traditional Blues Album at the 38th Annual Grammy Awards.

The Austin American-Statesman favored the album in its review, while it remarked that the release was "less consistent and polished" than that of Juke Box Music. The Fort Worth Star-Telegram gave it three-and-a-half stars out of five. Of the performances, the reviewer considered the band "well-rehearsed, but still loose", while he felt that Sahm "sings his skinny behind off". The Atlanta Constitution gave it three stars out of five as it declared that te release "mixes the right amount of reverence and hokum". The Detroit Free Press found it "nothing startling, but a lazy good time", as it rated it with two-and-a-half stars out of five. 
The Lincoln Journal Star gave it four stars out of five. The reviewer felt that the record was "about loving and living the music and playing and singing it with heart and soul." The Central New Jersey Home News deemed it Sahm's "best release in years." The St. Louis Post-Dispatch delivered a favorable review. The reviewer felt that Sahm "sings his heart out", while the band "is stunning throughout". AllMusic gave it three stars out of five, critic Thom Owens opined that it was "a nearly perfect roots record" and "arguably (Sahm's) best record ever."

Track listing

Personnel

Musicians:

Doug Sahm - vocals, piano and guitar
Rocky Morales - tenor saxophone
Louis Bustos - tenor saxophone
Charlie McBurney - trumpet
Al Gomez - trumpet
John Blondell - trombone
Mark Kazanoff - baritone saxophone
Jack Barber - bass, vocals
Louie Terrazas - bass
George Rains - drums 
Denny Freeman - guitar
Sauce Gonzalez - Hammond organ
Mel Brown - keyboards
Derek O'brien - rhythm Guitar

Studio:
Doug Sahm - producer, mixing
Derek O'Brien - producer, mixing
Clifford Antone - executive producer
Randy Kling - mastering
Larry Greenhill - sound engineer
Stuart Sullivan - sound engineer
Malcom Harper - sound engineer, mastering

References

Sources

 
 

 
 
 
 

 
 
 
 
 

1995 albums
Doug Sahm albums